Eastphalian is:
 a resident of Eastphalia (Ostfalen), a historic region of Germany;
 the Eastphalian language (Ostfälisch) of West Low German.